Benno Hans Möhlmann (born 1 August 1954) is a German retired football player and manager. He played for Preußen Münster, Werder Bremen, and Hamburger SV.

Playing career
Möhlmann began his senior career in 1972 as a midfielder with Preußen Münster in third tier Regionalliga. In 1978, he moved to Werder Bremen in the Bundesliga. He remained with Bremen until 1987 when he moved to Hamburger SV, finishing his playing career in 1989. In total, Möhlmann played in 255 Bundesliga matches, scoring 35 goals.

Managerial career
Möhlmann's managing career started at Hamburger SV in 1992. From 1995 until 1997 Möhlmann was manager of Eintracht Braunschweig, then Möhlmann moved to Greuther Fürth, staying at that club until 2000. From 2000 until 2004, Möhlmann was manager of Arminia Bielefeld, winning promotion to 1. Bundesliga in 2002, but the team was immediately relegated the year after. Möhlmann was left in February 2004 and returned to Greuther Fürth. Möhlmann became manager of Eintracht Braunschweig in July 2007. After a string of unsatisfying performances by the team, Möhlmann stepped down as manager in May 2008. In July 2008, Möhlmann became for the third time the manager of Greuther Fürth, but he cancelled his contract on 20 December 2009. On 7 November 2010, Möhlmann was appointed manager of FC Ingolstadt. After almost exactly one year with Ingolstadt, Möhlmann was sacked as manager on 9 November 2011, after losing four of the five previous matches. Möhlmann became manager of FSV Frankfurt on 21 December 2011. He was sacked on 18 May 2015. His final match was a 3–1 loss to Union Berlin. On 6 October he was appointed as the head coach of 1860 Munich. He was sacked on 19 April 2016.

On 15 October 2016, he was appointed as the new head coach of Preußen Münster. He was sacked on 10 December 2017.

Managerial statistics

Honours
Bundesliga runner-up: 1982–83, 1984–85 and 1985–86
UEFA European Under-21 Football Championship runner-up: 1982

References

External links
 
 Benno Möhlmann Interview

1954 births
Living people
People from Vechta (district)
Footballers from Lower Saxony
German footballers
Germany under-21 international footballers
Association football midfielders
Bundesliga players
2. Bundesliga players
SC Preußen Münster players
SV Werder Bremen players
Hamburger SV players
German football managers
Bundesliga managers
2. Bundesliga managers
Hamburger SV managers
Eintracht Braunschweig managers
SpVgg Greuther Fürth managers
Arminia Bielefeld managers
FC Ingolstadt 04 managers
FSV Frankfurt managers
TSV 1860 Munich managers
3. Liga managers
SC Preußen Münster managers